Daniel Frischman (born April 23, 1959) is an American actor, comedian, writer, director and magician. He was born in Whippany, New Jersey. He is best known for his roles as Chris Potter on the Nickelodeon sitcom Kenan & Kel and Arvid Engen on the ABC sitcom Head of the Class. He is noted for playing socially inept "geeks" and "nerds". Frischman is a member of The Magic Castle, who belongs to the Academy of Magic Arts in Hollywood.

Frischman's birthdate is often listed as 1964, because early in his career his acting agent encouraged him to falsify his age to make himself more eligible for teenaged acting roles.

Early life
Frischman was raised in the Whippany section of Hanover Township, New Jersey. He attended Whippany Park High School, graduating in 1977, before attending Penn State University.

Before television

Frischman developed an interest in magic as a child after seeing an ad in Boys' Life magazine. Before Frischman's television breakthrough, he often worked as a magician in the Los Angeles area under the pseudonym "The Great Houdanny" (in reference to Harry Houdini) performing at, amongst other things, children's birthday parties and charity events. He brought his brand of comedy to his magic shows and was a popular hire in the mid-1980s.

Early appearance

He was first noticed in a March 17, 1982, episode of the NBC television series The Facts of Life.  In the episode, titled "Kids Can Be Cruel" Frischman played high school student "Carl 'Rocky' Price" who was picked on by his peers because of his acne and nerd-like personality.  The students in the episode referred to Frischman's character as "Pizzaface", because of his pronounced acne blemishes and scars.  In the episode the character Natalie Green, played by actress Mindy Cohn, gets angry at her roommate Blair Warner (Lisa Whelchel) and sets her up with Frischman's character "Rocky" as a cruel joke.

In 1983, Frischman appeared in the comedy film Get Crazy as Joey, a typically nerdy (and virginal) stagehand who ultimately gets the girl.  Also in 1983, he starred in the "Things your Parents Used to Say" sequence in Good-bye, Cruel World.

Frischman appeared in both these projects alongside his sometime roommate, comedian Andrew J. Lederer, who played smaller roles.
Frischman and Lederer also appeared together as two of the "Schlongini Singers"  in the Andrew "Dice" Clay horror comedy, Wacko and (with Adam Small and Felice Seiler) in the comedy group, The Ding Dongs.

Head of the Class
Frischman's first co-starring role was that of Manhattan-based high school student Arvid Engen on ABC-TV's late 1980s/early 1990s series Head of the Class.  Though playing a teenager, Frischman was 27 as the series started, and 32 when it concluded.

Arvid was a bespectacled geek who was an early connoisseur of computer culture as well as a budding scientist. Arvid and his classmates were considered possible geniuses and were placed in the "I.H.P. Individualized Honors Program" for advanced and gifted students.

On Saturday December 20, 1986, Frischman and the cast of Head of the Class were the celebrity guests on the urban music series Soul Train.  On Wednesday July 15, 1987 Frischman appeared as that evening's guest on NBC-TV's talk show Late Night with David Letterman.

Kenan & Kel
Frischman's second co-starring role was the character of Chris Potter in the 1990s Nickelodeon TV series Kenan & Kel, a spin-off of Nickelodeon's All That starring Kenan Thompson and Kel Mitchell. Once again Frischman played a socially awkward nerd, this time as Chris Potter, Kenan's boss at Rigby's, a small grocery store.

Chris often informs customers and other guests that he has a radio in his car in an attempt to make conversation. One of Chris' anxieties was a recurring dream that he was being chased by a giant bunny.

Cameos
Frischman made a short appearance on the 1990s series Seinfeld. In episode 93, titled "The Mom & Pop Store" (which originally aired on Thursday November 17, 1994 on U.S. television network NBC), Frischman plays a man who phones Jerry Seinfeld to tell the comedian that he has found his stolen sneaker collection at a yard sale in Parsippany, New Jersey (located just north of the town Frischman grew up in); Frischman asked to change the name of the place in the script from Parsippany to his hometown of Whippany, but Seinfeld declined, saying "No, 'Whippany' doesn't sound like the name of a real town."

On October 24, 2005, Frischman was a celebrity panelist on I Love the '80s 3-D, a television program on VH1.

Personal life
Frischman announced on his Facebook page in 2019 that he had recently discovered he had a biological daughter Emily, now in her mid-30s, and a grandson Roy. Frischman briefly dated Emily's mother when he was 22 years old. He lost contact with her, unaware that she was pregnant and that she later put her baby up for adoption. Frischman learned of his daughter's existence in January 2019 through the DNA testing web site 23andMe. He soon met her along with her husband Neil and their son Roy, describing them as "a beautiful new family that I’m building a relationship with."

Filmography

Television

Film

References

External links
Official website

1959 births
Male actors from New Jersey
American male film actors
American male television actors
Jewish American male actors
Living people
Pennsylvania State University alumni
People from Hanover Township, New Jersey
21st-century American Jews